The Indian Board of School Education (IBOSE), is the Board of Education for private education, under the Government of India. It was established by the S.R. Acts XXI of 1860 of the Government of India in 2007 to provide education inexpensively to remote areas. The IBOSE is a national board that administers examinations for Secondary and Senior Secondary examinations of schools.

It had an enrolment of about thousands students from 2008–2015 at secondary and senior secondary levels and enrols about one thousand students annually which makes it the largest private schooling system in the India.

The Indian Board of School Education have regional information centres or study centres all over India.

Courses
The Indian Board of School Education offer the following courses:

 Secondary Course—Equivalent to class X (10TH)
 Senior Secondary Course—Equivalent to class XII (12th)

Examinations
The public examinations are held annually in the months of March–April on dates fixed by the Indian Board of School Education.

See also
 Central Board of Secondary Education (CBSE),India
 BOSSE - Board of Open Schooling and Skill Education, Sikkim
 Council for the Indian School Certificate Examinations (CISCE), India ( ICSE and ISC examinations are conducted by CISCE )
 National Institute of Open Schooling (NIOS)
 Indian School Certificate (ISC), India
 Indian Certificate of Secondary Education (ICSE), India
 Secondary School Leaving Certificate (SSLC)
 West Bengal Board of Secondary Education (WBBSE), India
 Maharashtra State Board of Secondary and Higher Secondary Education (महाराष्ट्र राज्य माध्यमिक व उच्च माध्यमिक शिक्षण मंडळ) (MSBSHSE), India
 All India Institute of Open Schooling Board, Delhi (AIIOS),India

References

External links
 

School qualifications
Distance education in India
School boards in India
High school course levels